Joanna Mostov (born 1980), known professionally as Joanna Angel, is an American pornographic and mainstream actress, director, and writer of adult films. She founded the website BurningAngel.com in April 2002 with her roommate Mitch Fontaine, and has been credited with helping the growth of the alt porn genre. Launched as a response to websites such as SuicideGirls, the website featured alternative performers acting in exclusively hardcore scenes with a stronger focus on a punk aesthetic.

Early life
Angel was born in Brooklyn, New York, to an Israeli mother and an American father. She was raised in River Edge in Bergen County, New Jersey, where she attended Cherry Hill Elementary School and graduated from River Dell Regional High School in 1998. After graduating, she enrolled in Rutgers University, where she earned a Bachelor of Arts degree in English literature with a minor in Film Studies.

According to the Jewish Telegraphic Agency, Angel is believed to be the first person in the pornography industry to have been raised in Orthodox Judaism.
She worked in a kosher fast food restaurant in Teaneck during high school, then at an Applebee's and another restaurant called Happy's Health Grille during college.
She eventually relocated to the Williamsburg section of Brooklyn, New York, and with Mitch Fontaine created the website BurningAngel.com.

Pornography career

Angel is a former model for Suicide Girls, a softcore pornography website. In her early 20s she founded the "indie-punk-porn" site BurningAngel.com, featuring interviews and stories of sex with band members, along with nude photographs. Drawing inspiration from a live sex performance by porn actress Nina Hartley, Angel later began making hardcore movies for the site.

According to Encyclopedia of the Zombie, Angel is "regarded as a major influence in the mainstreaming of alt porn", and is credited with making the genre financially viable. She has produced and performed in several zombie-themed hardcore films: Re-Penetrator (2005), Dong of the Dead (2009), Evil Head (2012), and The Walking Dead: A Hardcore Parody (2013). She said in a 2006 interview, "I think [alt porn is] a movement. I think I've started something."

Angel has written, produced, directed and starred in films available exclusively through BurningAngel, as well as appearing in more traditionally distributed adult films. She was under an exclusive contract with VCA Pictures, which expired in March 2007, and was, at one time, represented by the adult talent agency Bad Ass Models.

Appearances

Following the success of BurningAngel, Angel has been featured in numerous magazines and newspapers, including The New York Times.

Angel briefly wrote a monthly sex advice column for Spin. She also contributed a chapter to the book Naked Ambition, edited by Carly Milne.

In 2010, Angel appeared in a public service announcement for the Free Speech Coalition on the topic of Internet copyright infringement of adult content, directed by Michael Whiteacre. The spot, entitled the "FSC All-Star Anti-Piracy PSA", found her in the company of adult performers such as Lisa Ann, Julie Meadows, Kimberly Kane, Ron Jeremy and Wicked Pictures contract stars, Alektra Blue and Kaylani Lei.

In 2011, Angel was named by CNBC as one of the 12 most popular stars in porn. CNBC noted that she owns her own studio and that the "punk look" that she and her other actors share has created a new genre in the porn industry, called alt porn.  Also, in 2011, Angel made a cameo on the Adult Swim show Childrens Hospital, in the season three episode "Night Shift." She played herself as a porn star and family friend of Rob Corddry's character Dr. Blake.

Angel sometimes appears on Cracked.com as a friend of the columnists and appears in the music video for "Sound Wave Superior" by Emmure.

In 2013, Angel appeared in the independent film Scrapper, starring Michael Beach and Aidan Gillen, along with the ensemble cast musical comedy Skum Rocks!  In 2014, she had roles in the crime drama The Owl in Echo Park and the Kevin Nealon comedy series Racquetball.  She also appeared in the documentary film Doc of the Dead, which features Interviews with Max Brooks, Stuart Gordon, Jacqui Holland, Robert Kirkman, Greg Nicotero and Judith O'Dea.

Personal life
Angel dated fellow porn star James Deen for six years, between 2005 and 2011. On December 2, 2015, she appeared on The Jason Ellis Show to give more details about her "violent and scary" six-year relationship with Deen.

Angel married fellow adult film actor Aaron "Small Hands" Thompson on October 31, 2016.

Angel is a Democrat. In 2015, she endorsed Bernie Sanders for President of the United States in the Democratic primaries for 2016 U.S. presidential election.

Awards
Angel was nominated in 2006 for the AVN Awards for both Best New Starlet and Best Actress, and although she won neither, she did take home the award for "Most Outrageous Sex Scene" for her appearance in Re-Penetrator. She was nominated for the 2009 AVN Award for "The Jenna Jameson Crossover Star of the Year".

 2006 AVN Award – Most Outrageous Sex Scene (Re-Penetrator) with Tommy Pistol
 2007 XBIZ Award – Crossover Move of the Year
 2008 XRCO Award – Best On-Screen Chemistry (with James Deen)
 2011 AVN Award – Best Porn Star Website (Editor's Choice) – JoannaAngel.com
 2011 AVN Award – Best Solo Sex Scene (Rebel Girl)
 2011 NightMoves Award – Best Director (Editor's Choice)
 2012 NightMoves Award – Best Individual Website (Editor's Choice) – JoannaAngel.com
 2012 NightMoves Triple Play Award (Dancing/Performing/Directing)
 2013 AVN Award – Best Porn Star Website – JoannaAngel.com
 2013 AVN Award – Best Solo Sex Scene (Joanna Angel: Filthy Whore)
 2013 NightMoves Award – Best Ink (Editor's Choice)
 2013 NightMoves Hall of Fame inductee
 2014 AVN Award – Best Porn Star Website – JoannaAngel.com (tied with AsaAkira.com)
 2015 AVN Award – Best Porn Star Website – JoannaAngel.com
 2016 AVN Hall of Fame inductee
 2016 XRCO Hall of Fame inductee
 2018 XBIZ Award - Best Actress - Comedy Release and Best Sex Scene - Comedy Release, (Jews Love Black Cock (Burning Angel/Exile)
 2019 XBIZ Award - Best Actress - Comedy Release (Dirty Grandpa (Burning Angel))
 2019 XBIZ Award - Best Supporting Actress (Talk Derby to Me (Sweetheart Video)))
 2019 XBIZ Award - Best Sex Scene - All-Sex Release (Joanna Angel Gangbang: As Above, So Below (Burning Angel))
 2022 AVN Award - Best Screenplay (Casey: A True Story)

References

External links

 
 
 
 

Living people
Alt porn
American female adult models
American pornographic film actresses
American people of Israeli descent
American pornographic film directors
American pornographic film producers
American women screenwriters
Businesspeople from New Jersey
Businesspeople from New York City
American women film directors
Film directors from New York City
Jewish American actresses
Jewish American screenwriters
Jewish women writers
People from River Edge, New Jersey
People from Williamsburg, Brooklyn
Pornographic film actors from New Jersey
Pornographic film actors from New York (state)
River Dell Regional High School alumni
Rutgers University alumni
Women pornographic film directors
Women pornographic film producers
Film directors from New Jersey
Screenwriters from New York (state)
Screenwriters from New Jersey
1980 births
21st-century American Jews
21st-century American women